Juan León Cañete Guex (born 27 July 1929, date of death unknown) was a Paraguayan football forward.

Cañete started his career in Club Presidente Hayes before playing for Brazilian sides Botafogo and Vasco da Gama, in which he won the Campeonato Carioca. In 1951, he was one of several Paraguayan footballers to play for Boca Juniors de Cali.

At the national team level, Cañete was part of the Paraguay squad that competed in the 1950 FIFA World Cup; as well as taking part in the 1955 Copa America, 1956 Copa America and 1959 Copa America.

Cañete is deceased.

References

 A.Gowarzewski : "FUJI Football Encyclopedia. World Cup FIFA*part I*Biographical Notes - Heroes of Mundials" ; GiA Katowice 1993

External links

1929 births
Year of death missing
Paraguayan footballers
Botafogo de Futebol e Regatas players
CR Vasco da Gama players
Paraguay international footballers
1950 FIFA World Cup players
Paraguayan expatriate footballers
Expatriate footballers in Brazil
Club Presidente Hayes footballers
Association football forwards